The Independence Party of Palestine (Hizb al-Istiqlal) was an Arab nationalist political party established on 13 August 1932 in Palestine during the British Mandate. The party was founded by Muhammad Izzat Darwaza, and the other founders of the party were Fahmi al-Abboushi, Mu'in al-Madi, Akram Zu'aytir, ‘Ajaj Nuwayhid, Rashid al-Hajj Ibrahim, Subhi al-Khadra, and Salim Salamah. The party did not achieve a large membership but Awni Abd al-Hadi, through his role as private secretary to Amir Feisal in Damascus between 1918-1920, had good relations with many senior leaders across the Arab World.

Its origins lay in the Istiqlal movement associated with the short-lived Sharifian government in Damascus.

The party's creation was spurred by the al-Husayni - Nashashibi rivalry, which had almost paralyzed the Palestinian national movement. Its founders, most of whom hailed from the Nablus area, called for the adoption of new methods of political action, including noncooperation with the British Mandate authorities and nonpayment of taxes. The party also called for total Arab independence, pan-Arab unity, the abrogation of the Mandate and the Balfour Declaration, and the establishment of Arab parliamentary rule in Palestine. The party called for mass resistance to the Zionist project and its British patron in Palestine. During the 1936–39 Arab revolt the party called for an Indian Congress Party-style boycott of the British.

The party reached its maximum influence, especially among the young and the educated, in the first half of 1933, and then declined very rapidly. Among the factors responsible for its decline were the active hostility of the Husayni camp, the lack of financial resources. A distinctive mark of the party was its espousal of the idea that British imperialism was the principal enemy of the Palestinians; thus the party urged them to focus their struggle not simply on Zionism, but on British colonialism as well.

Istiqlal was represented on the first Arab Higher Committee formed in April 1937, with its leader, Awni Abd al-Hadi, being general secretary of the AHC. Following the continuing disturbances, and the assassination on 26 September 1937 of the Acting British District Commissioner of Galilee, the AHC and other political parties, including Istiqlal, were outlawed by the British administration in October 1937. Al-Hadi, who was out of the country at the time, was not allowed to return. However, he was a member of the Palestinian Arab delegation that attended the 1939 London Conference.

See also
:Category:Independence Party (Mandatory Palestine) politicians

Notes

References
Choueiri, Youssef M. (2000). Arab Nationalism: Nation and State in the Arab World. Oxford: Blackwell. 
Hassassian, Manuel Sarkis (1990). Palestine: Factionalism in the National Movement, 1919-1939. Palestinian Academic Society for the Study of International Affairs.
Kedourie, Elie (1974). Arabic Political Memoirs and Other Studies. London: Routledge. 
Khalidi, Rashid (1997). Palestinian Identity: The Construction of Modern National Consciousness. Columbia University Press. 
Khalidi, Rashid (2001). The Palestinians and 1948: the underlying causes of failure. In Eugene L. Rogan and Avi Shlaim (Eds.). The War for Palestine: Rewriting the History of 1948(pp. 12–36). Cambridge. Cambridge University Press. 
Pappé, Ilan (1999). The Israel/Palestine Question. London: Routledge. 
A Survey of Palestine - prepared in December 1945 and January 1946 for the information of the Anglo-American Committee of Inquiry. Reprinted 1991 by the Institute of Palestine Studies, Washington. Volume II. .

Arab nationalism in Mandatory Palestine
Arab nationalist political parties
Organizations based in Mandatory Palestine
Political parties in Mandatory Palestine
Political parties established in 1932
1932 establishments in Mandatory Palestine
Political parties disestablished in 1937
1937 disestablishments in Mandatory Palestine